"Blessed" is the fourth single by R&B singer Jill Scott from her #1 album The Light of the Sun. (2011) It was sent to radio on February 28, 2012.

Song information
"Blessed" is the introduction track to The Light of the Sun. An upbeat joint, it signifies Jill's blessings in life such as her beautiful, healthy, son, Jett, her grandmother's grossing age, and the presence of her mother and father. It is written by Scott herself along with Andre Harris and Vidal Davis.

Live performances
Scott performed "Blessed" at the 42nd annual NAACP Image Awards. It was performed as an encore song on her 2011 Summer Block Party tour.

Video
The video was shot at a club in February and premiered on VH1 on April 23, 2012.

Chart performance
On the week of March 17, 2012, "Blessed" debuted at #96 on the Billboard's Hot R&B/Hip-Hop Songs. On the week of March 24, it rose to #55. It eventually rose to its current peak at #21. On June 19, 2012, it reached the top spot on the Urban AC charts exactly one year after her Billboard top 10 collaboration, "So in Love" with Anthony Hamilton.

Charts

Weekly charts

Year-end charts

References

Jill Scott (singer) songs
Warner Music Group singles
2011 songs
Songs written by Vidal Davis
Songs written by Andre Harris
Songs written by Jill Scott (singer)
Song recordings produced by Dre & Vidal